Quantang Subdistrict (Chinese: 泉塘街道) is a subdistrict in Changsha County, Changsha, Hunan province, China. It was established in September 2009, and is made up of six neighborhoods and two administrative villages.

Divisions of Changsha County
Changsha County